Diogo Douglas Santos Andrade Barbosa (born 18 December 1984), known as just Diogo, is a Brazilian footballer.

Biography

Brasileiro Série C
Born in Estância, Sergipe state, Diogo started his career at Club Sportivo Sergipe. In December 2004 he was signed by Mogi Mirim and later extended his contract until 31 December 2005. After a season in 2005 Campeonato Paulista and 2005 Campeonato Brasileiro Série C, he left for Monte Azul of 2006 Campeonato Paulista Série A3. In May, he returned to Sergipe for Confiança for 2006 Campeonato Brasileiro Série C.

Sport Recife & Corinthians
In December 2006 he was signed by Clube Atlético do Porto in 3-year contract, but after 2007 Campeonato Pernambucano, he was signed by Sport Recife in April, which he made his debut in the top division, winning 2008 Campeonato Pernambucano and 2008 Copa do Brasil.

In September 2008 he was signed by second division side Corinthians, via Brasa, which the lower division club retained 50% economic rights on Diogo for investor.

On 31 August 2009 he was signed by Bahia until May 2010. In March 2010, he was signed by Ceará until December 2010. He suffered from injury and only played 4 games in Série A. In September, he left for Grêmio Prudente but did not play.

In January 2011 his contract with Corinthians was terminated. In February, he was signed by São Caetano until the end of 2011 Campeonato Paulista.

Career statistics

Note
State leagues were marked as League Cup

Honours
national
Copa do Brasil (2) in 2008 with Sport Club do Recife; 2009 with Sport Club Corinthians Paulista
Campeonato Brasileiro Série B in 2008 with Sport Club Corinthians Paulista
state
Campeonato Paulista in 2011 with Sport Club Corinthians Paulista
Campeonato Pernambucano in 2008 with Sport Club do Recife

References

External links
 UOL 
 
 
 
 

Brazilian footballers
Mogi Mirim Esporte Clube players
Atlético Monte Azul players
Associação Desportiva Confiança players
Clube Atlético do Porto players
Sport Club do Recife players
Sport Club Corinthians Paulista players
Esporte Clube Bahia players
Ceará Sporting Club players
Grêmio Barueri Futebol players
Associação Desportiva São Caetano players
Santa Cruz Futebol Clube players
Association football fullbacks
Sportspeople from Sergipe
1984 births
Living people